Riva Lehrer (born in 1958 in Cincinnati, Ohio) is an American painter, writer, teacher, and speaker. Lehrer was born with spina bifida and has undergone numerous surgeries throughout her life. Her work focuses on issues of physical identity and how bodies are viewed by society, especially in explorations of cultural depictions of disability. Lehrer is well known as both an artist and an activist in the field of Disability Culture.

Early life
Lehrer's early education took place at Condon School for Handicapped Children, which was one of the first schools in the United States to offer a standardized education to disabled children. She had many surgeries in her early life to render her body more "normal". spending a significant part of her childhood in the hospital, she got an intimate view of medicine which influenced her career as an educator and an artist.

In 1980, she moved to Chicago, where she lives and continues to exhibit her work.

Career
Her work focuses mainly on people's physical identity as well as political themes including disability.  After moving to Chicago, she became aware of the works of other artists, joined a disabled artist group, and began one of her best known series:The Circle Stories. Lehrer is the curator for the Access Living Collection of Art and an adjunct professor at the School of the Art Institute of Chicago. Her interest in anatomy originally led her to consider a career in medicine, but due to the lack of accommodations she soon felt this goal was unrealistic. Instead she decided on an art career where she would have more control over her schedule and where she could “prove her interests in biology and medicine”. Her works on a whole are meant to reject the idea of pity and inspire a new way of thinking about the beauty of disabilities.

Lehrer's creative work has been supported through a variety of grants and awards. Awards include the 2017 3Arts MacDowell Fellowship for writing, 2015 3Arts Residency Fellowship at the University of Illinois; the 2014 Carnegie Mellon Fellowship at Haverford and Bryn Mawr Colleges; and the 2009 Prairie Fellowship at the Ragdale Foundation. Grants include the 2009 Critical Fierceness Grant, the 2008 3Arts Foundation Grant, and the 2006 Wynn Newhouse Award for Excellence, (NYC), as well as grants from the Illinois Arts Council, the University of Illinois, and the National Endowment for the Arts.

Teaching experience
Lehrer has worked at both the School of the Art Institute of Chicago and Northwestern University.

Circle Stories 
Lehrer began The Circle Stories series in 1997 and continued expanding it through 2004. The Circle Stories is a series of portraits of Lehrer's fellow disabled artists. The title of the series refers to the "circular" method that Lehrer employed in the creative process, "involving extensive interviews with each participant." In her work, she aims to honor the “community of disabled innovators who provide support and context for the work of redefinition of disability in the 21st century".

Other series 
Lehrer's If Body series stems from the fact that people tend to visualize what they are going to look like at an older age and how that image can change over time. The pieces themselves represent her personal ideals about her body and how those ideals have changed over time. “The self-portraits of her If Body series chart this schism between the imaginary “normal” body I imagine I “should” have had, and my relationship to my subjective “actual” body".

The Family series breaks the stereotype and myth that disabled people are loners. It goes on to show that people, disabled or not, form links, connections, and relationships with others. Lehrer explains “The Family drawings are an ongoing document of my own community of belonging. Some are blood relations, others are people who I consider part of my survival. They are a testament to the power that human beings have to transform each others lives”.

The Totems and Familiars series are portraits that focus on people's objects of power (totems) and alter egos (familiars,) and how this iconography "helped (her subjects) through troubled times."

Golem Girl
Lehrer's 2020 book Golem Girl: a memoir, published by Virago, was the first winner of the  Barbellion Prize, a literary award for writers who live with illness or disability. It was also a finalist for the 2020 National Book Critics Circle Award for Memoir and Autobiography. In Kirkus Reviews it was described as "An extraordinary memoir suffused with generosity, consistent insight, and striking artwork."

Exhibits 

 AIR Gallery  
 	Aldrich Museum of Contemporary Art (Ridgefield, CT), 
 	 Arnot Museum 
 	 Chicago Cultural Center 
 	 DeCordova Museum (Lincoln, MA).
 	 Elmhurst Museum 
 	 Frye Art Museum (Seattle, WA), 
 	 Herron Gallery at Indiana University 
 	 Lafayette Museum of Art 
 	 Mary Leigh Bloch Museum 
	 Mobile Museum of Art
	 Muskegon Museum of Art (MI), 
	 National Museum of Women in the Arts (Washington, D.C.),
	Printworks Gallery (Chicago)
Riverside Arts Center
	 Susan Cummis Gallery
	United Nations (NY)
	 University of Notre Dame

Selected publications

Awards, achievements, and recognitions 
 2020 · Barbellion Prize for Golem Girl
 2017 · Society for Disability Studies Presidential Award
 2015 · 3Arts Residency Fellowship at the University of Illinois
 2014 · Mellon Residency Fellowship at Haverford and Bryn Mawr Colleges
 2010 · The Critical Fierceness Grant
 2009 · Prairie Fellowship at the Ragdale Foundation
 2008 · Three Arts Foundation of Chicago grant for artistic achievement
 2007 · Wynn Newhouse Award, Samuel I. Newhouse Foundation
 2006 · Wynn Newhouse Award for Excellence (an unrestricted grant for $50,000)
 2001 · Carol J. Gill Award for Disability Culture, The Progress Center, Chicago	
 1999 · Chicago Artist's Assistance Program Grant, Chicago Department of Cultural Affair
 1999 · Special Assistance Grant, Illinois Arts Council
 1998 · Honorable Mention, Portrait Show, Elmhurst Art Museum
 1996-97 · Arts Midwest/NEA Regional Visual Arts Fellowship Award
 1993-95 · Presidential Merit Scholarship, The School of the Art Institute, Chicago
 1994 · Scholarship, Anderson Ranch, Snowmass CO
 1993 · First Prize, Schoharie National Small Works Show
 1992 · Honorable Mention, Schoharie National Small Works Show

References

External links 

 Official website

External links 
Artist Website Riva Lehrer
Printworks 
 New House Award 

1958 births
Living people
Writers from Cincinnati
20th-century American painters
21st-century American painters
American women writers
Artists with disabilities
American women painters
20th-century American women artists
21st-century American women artists
People with spina bifida
Educators from Ohio
American women educators